Beowulf Boritt is a New York City-based scenic designer for theater. He is known for his scenic design for the play Act One, which earned him the 2014 Tony Award for Best Scenic Design in a Play.

Early life 
Boritt was born to American Civil War scholar Gabor Boritt and his wife, Elizabeth Boritt, an aspiring opera singer. Gabor Boritt fled Hungary for South Dakota after the failure of the Hungarian Revolution of 1956. They reside in Gettysburg, Pennsylvania. Boritt has two brothers, Jake Boritt who is a film producer and Daniel Boritt who is a biologist specializing in birds.

Boritt cites his grandmother Anita Marie Wilson Norseen Hooker as a major inspiration for designing sets, as she was an artist and scenic designer at Wellesley College but was told that it was not appropriate for a woman to do in the 1930s. "She encouraged me artistically to express myself and bought me my first set of oil paints. My parents encouraged me, yes, but my grandmother was the big influence."

Boritt went on to receive his B.A. from Vassar College where he pursued a degree in literature, not believing he could make it in scenic design:

I honestly don't think I meant to become a professional designer. I'm a little disingenuous for saying that, but I don't think I thought it was possible. I don't know if there was ever a moment where I said I'm going to pursue this. I thought I might become a college professor and teach set design somewhere. To do that I needed a master's degree. I started designing around the city a little bit while I was in graduate school and one thing led to another and I had several lucky breaks and started building a career.

Then, he received his M.F.A. from New York University's Tisch School of the Arts program for design for stage and film.

He is married to actress Mimi Bilinski.

Career 

After meeting Boritt at NYU, Hal Prince asked him to design Daisy Prince's production of The Last Five Years and later Prince's production Paradise Found. Soon after, designing The 25th Annual Putnam County Spelling Bee launched his career on Broadway.

Since then, he has designed over 20 Broadway shows, including his Tony Award-winning Act One and -nominated The Scottsboro Boys.

In 2007, he was awarded the Obie Award for sustained excellence in scenic design. He has also won the AUDELCO Award for set design in 2002 and the 2012 Tony Award for Best Scenic Design.

In 2015, Boritt designed the set for the Broadway debut of Helen Edmundson's play Thérèse Raquin.

In 2016, Boritt was featured in a Microsoft Windows 10 commercial that aired nationwide.

In 2016, he designed Chinese and American cooperated Broadway shows 'Jay Chou's The Secret'.

In 2017, he was featured in a New York Times article about his renovation of his home using his scenic design expertise.

Awards and nominations

Other
In 2022 Boritt founded The 1/52 Project, a financial grant program to encourage early career designers from historically excluded groups.

References

External links
 Beowulf Boritt IBDB
 

Living people
Tony Award winners
Year of birth missing (living people)